Yorba may refer to:

People:
Bernardo Yorba (1800–1858), native of Nueva California and the son of Spanish soldier, José Antonio Yorba
José Antonio Yorba (1743–1825), Spanish soldier and early settler of Spanish California

Music:
"Hotel Yorba", the lead single from White Blood Cells, by Detroit (Michigan) garage rock band The White Stripes

Places:
Don Bernardo Yorba Ranchhouse, the most palatial adobe haciendas in all of Alta California
Placentia-Yorba Linda Unified School District (PYLUSD) is a public school district in Orange County, California
Rancho La Sierra (Yorba), 17,769-acre (71.91 km) Mexican land grant in present-day Riverside County, California
Yorba Linda, California, affluent suburban community in northeastern Orange County, California
Yorba Linda Fault, fault system that extends from North East Yorba Linda, California to the South Eastern portion of Chino Hills, California

Other:
Yorba Linda Firestorms, series of major wildfires in 2008 that originated in Corona, California
Yorba Linda Spotlight Theater, nonprofit theater organization for children and teenagers
Yorba Linda Water District, public agency responsible for water supply and quality for residents of Yorba Linda, California
Yorba Foundation, a non-profit software group based in San Francisco, known for developing Shotwell and Geary